Catherine J Marks is a record producer, mixing engineer and audio engineer. She has worked with such artists as Foals, Manchester Orchestra, The Killers, Local Natives, Wolf Alice,  Beware of Darkness, The Big Moon, Frank Carter & The Rattlesnakes, The Amazons, Arno, Howling Bells, Sunset Sons and Eliza Shaddad.

Early life
Born in Melbourne, Australia. Catherine was classically trained in piano from the age of four and has a master's degree in Architecture.

Career 
Marks met the Grammy Award winning record producer Flood, at a Nick Cave concert in Dublin in 2001. After finishing her degree, she moved to London in 2005 to train as an assistant engineer under Flood at Assault and Battery studios in North West London. Catherine continued to work closely with Flood on PJ Harvey records White Chalk and Let England Shake, and on the Editors' In This Light & on This Evening.

In 2009 Catherine began working alongside the Brit Award-Winning British mixer and producer Alan Moulder, where she did engineering and mixing work on projects including Interpol, Foals, Death Cab for Cutie, Killers, Ronnie Vannuci and Blonde Redhead.

Marks won the 2016 MPG Awards as Breakthrough Producer of The Year.

In 2018 Catherine won MPG Producer of the Year.

Awards and nominations
Grammy Awards

Music Producers Guild (MPG) Awards

Heavy Music Awards

Selected production/mixing/engineering credits
Selected production credits:

2023: Boygenius - The Record - Album (producer)
2022: Lowertown - I Love to Lie - Album (producer)
2022: The Mysterines - Reeling - Album (producer)
2020: Alanis Morissette - Such Pretty Forks in the Road - co-produced with Alex Hope
2018: The Wombats - Beautiful People Will Ruin Your Life - Album (co-producing) 
2017: Mélanie De Biasio - Lilies - Album (Mixing) 
2017: Manchester Orchestra - A Black Mile To The Surface - Album (Producing, Mixing) 
2017: The Amazons - Black Magic - Track (Producing, Mixing) 
2017: Frank Carter & The Rattlesnakes - Modern Ruin  - Album (Mixing) 
2016: The Amazons - Little Something - Track (Producing, Mixing)  
2016: Beware of Darkness - Are You Real? - Album (Co-Producing, Mixing)  
2016: Local Natives - Masters - Track (Co-Producing) 
2016: The Big Moon - Cupid - Track (Producing, Mixing) 
2016: The Big Moon - Silent Movie Susie - Track (Producing, Mixing) 
2016: Zack Lopez - One More Day - Track (Mixing) 
2016: Zack Lopez - Don't Say I Won't - Track (Mixing) 
2016: The Amazons - Night Driving -Track (Producing, Mixing) 
2016: April Towers - Silent Fever - Track (Producing, Mixing) 
2016: April Towers - Losing Youth - Track (Producing, Mixing) 
2016: Eliza Shaddad - Run - EP (Producing, Mixing) 
2016: Arno - Human Incognito - Album (Recorded) 
2015: INHEAVEN - Bitter Town -Track (Producing) 
2015: The Amazons - Don't You Wanna - EP (Producing, Mixing) 
2015: Sunset Sons - She Wants - Track (Producing) 
2015: Fairchild - Nom De Guerre - Track (Producing, Mixing) 
2015: Baby Strange - California Sun - Track (Producing) 
2015: Champs - Vamala - Album (Mixing) 
2015: Sunset Sons - The Fall Line - EP (Producing) 
2014: Jagaara - Faultline - Track (Producing, Mixing) 
2014: Wolf Alice - Creature Songs - EP (Producing, Mixing) 
2014: Findlay - Wolfback - Track (Mixing)
2014: Howling Bells - Heartstrings- Album (Co-Producing, Mixing) 
2014: The Ramona Flowers - Dismantle and Rebuild - Album (Mixing) 
2014: Fairchild - Sadako - EP (Producing, Mixing) 
2014: Fairchild - Burning Feet - EP (Producing, Mixing) 
2014: Meanwhile -Bigger City - Track (Co-Producing, Mixing) 
2014: Lyon Apprentice - Be Honest, Be Wild, Be Free - EP (Mixing) 
2013: Buchanan - Human Spring - Album (Producer) 
2013: Mojo Fury - The Difference Between - Album (Mixing) 
2013: Mike Marlin - The Murderer - Track (Producer, Mixer) 
2013: Mike Marlin - Grand Reveal - Album (Mixer) 
2013: Foals - Holy Fire - Album (Engineering) 
2012: The Killers - Runaways - Track - (Mix/Engineer) 
2012: Ride - Live at Brixton Academy: 1992 - (Mixing) 
2012: A Silent Film - Sand & Snow -Album (Mixing) 
2012: Mike Marlin - Man On The Ground - (Producing, Mixing, Writer)

References

Living people
Year of birth missing (living people)
Australian record producers
Australian audio engineers
People from Melbourne
Women audio engineers
Australian women record producers